What a Man! is a 1944 American comedy film directed by William Beaudine and starring Johnny Downs, Wanda McKay and Robert Kent.

Cast
 Johnny Downs as Henry M. Burrows  
 Wanda McKay as Joan Rankin  
 Robert Kent as Steven M. Anderson  
 Etta McDaniel as BlueBell  
 Harry Holman as Harold D. Prewitt  
 I. Stanford Jolley as Parsons  
 Wheeler Oakman as Tim - 1st Detective  
 Lillian Bronson as Constance Burrows  
 Jack Baxley as George Rankin - Joan's Father 
 John Ince as Doctor Williams  
 Betty Sinclair as Office Worker  
 Dick Rush as Dutch - 2nd Detective  
 James Farley as Roberts - Office Worker  
 Henry Hall as Andy Johnson  
 Ralph Cathey as Office Boy

References

Bibliography
 Marshall, Wendy L. William Beaudine: From Silents to Television. Scarecrow Press, 2005.

External links
 

1944 films
1944 comedy films
1940s English-language films
American comedy films
Films directed by William Beaudine
Monogram Pictures films
American black-and-white films
1940s American films